Æthelbald (also Ethelbald or Aethelbald) may refer to:

Æthelbald of Mercia, King of Mercia, 716–757
Æthelbald, King of Wessex, 856–860
Æthelbald of York, Archbishop of York, 900–904
Æthelbald (bishop), bishop of Sherborne (died between 918 and 925)